Beaver is a town in Carroll County, Arkansas, United States. As of the 2020 census it had a population of 67. The community is located on the White River at the western limits of Table Rock Lake deep in the Ozark Mountains. Located north of Eureka Springs, the small town has been featured in movies for its picturesque scenery. The town is known for the Beaver Bridge, a two-panel suspension bridge over the White River listed on the National Register of Historic Places.

Geography

Beaver is located in northwestern Carroll County at  (36.475495, -93.771170).

Highway 187 is the only member of the Arkansas Highway System that serves Beaver. The route leads west  to US Highway 62, which provides access to Eureka Springs to the southeast and Rogers to the west. The Arkansas Highway 23, the Pig Trail Scenic Byway, runs near the town as well, a popular route with tourists and motorcyclists.

Demographics

As of the census of 2000, there were 95 people, 37 households, and 27 families residing in the town. The population density was 271.0 inhabitants per square mile (104.8/km2). The racial makeup of the town was 96.84% White, 2.11% from other races, and 1.05% from two or more races. 2.11% of the population were Hispanic or Latino of any race.

There were 37 households, of which 29.7% had children under the age of 18 living with them, 62.2% were married couples living together, 5.4% had a female householder with no husband present, and 27.0% were non-families. 21.6% of all households were made up of individuals, and 8.1% had someone living alone who was 65 years of age or older. The average household size was 2.57 and the average family size was 2.81.

In the town, the population was spread out, with 27.4% under the age of 18, 5.3% from 18 to 24, 23.2% from 25 to 44, 29.5% from 45 to 64, and 14.7% who were 65 years of age or older. The median age was 42 years. For every 100 females, there were 97.9 males. For every 100 females age 18 and over, there were 97.1 males.

The median income for a household in the town was $23,438, and the median income for a family was $25,417. Males had a median income of $25,417 versus $26,250 for females. The per capita income for the town was $11,665. There were 13.0% of families and 16.2% of the population living below the poverty line, including no one under the age of eighteen and none of those over 64.

Tourism

Beaver contains the Beaver Store Inn, a bed and breakfast and general store, located next to the waterfront town-operated Beaver RV and Camping Park.

Several miles to the south from the town of Beaver was Dinosaur World, a theme park covering , which had 100 life-size sculptures of dinosaurs and cavemen. It also featured a  statue of King Kong known as the "World's Largest King Kong". The park has been closed since 2005 and is  not open to the public

The Beaver Bridge was depicted in the 2005 film Elizabethtown, and a nearby train trestle was featured in The Blue and the Gray.

Climate
The climate is characterized by relatively high temperatures and evenly distributed precipitation throughout the year.  The Köppen Climate Classification subtype for this climate is "Cfa" (Humid Subtropical Climate).

See also

References

External links
Town of Beaver official website
Page about the World's Largest King Kong

Towns in Carroll County, Arkansas
Towns in Arkansas
Populated places established in 1981